Juncales is an order of flowering plants. In the Engler system (update, of 1964) and in the Cronquist system (of 1981, which placed this order in subclass Commelinidae) it is circumscribed as:

 order Juncales
 family Juncaceae
 family Thurniaceae

However, the Thorne system (1992) accepts it as consisting of :
 order Juncales
 family Prioniaceae
 family Thurniaceae
 family Juncaceae
 family Cyperaceae

The APG II system, used here, assigns the plants involved to the order Poales.

Historically recognized angiosperm orders